Los Angeles Stadium may refer to:

 SoFi Stadium, a stadium known as Los Angeles Stadium at Hollywood Park during construction in Inglewood, California, United States
 Proposed Los Angeles NFL stadiums#Los Angeles Stadium in Industry (2008) former proposed stadium in Industry, California, United States
 Proposed Los Angeles NFL stadiums#Carson Stadium (2015) former proposed stadium in Carson, California, United States
 Proposed Los Angeles NFL stadiums#Farmers Field (2010) former proposed stadium in downtown Los Angeles